P.T. (acronym for "playable teaser") is a psychological horror game developed by Kojima Productions, under the pseudonym "7780s Studio", and published by Konami. It was directed and designed by Hideo Kojima, in collaboration with filmmaker Guillermo del Toro.

Released for the PlayStation 4 on August 12, 2014 as a free download on the PlayStation Network, P.T. served as an interactive teaser for the game Silent Hills, an installment in the Silent Hill series. After the cancellation of Silent Hills, Konami removed P.T. from the PlayStation Store and made it impossible to reinstall. The decision prompted criticism, fan efforts to allow P.T. to be re-downloaded, and fan remakes.

P.T. received acclaim for its direction, visuals and visual storytelling, and its supernatural horror, while its puzzles drew mixed responses.

Gameplay

Unlike the third-person perspective in Silent Hill games, P.T. uses a first-person perspective, which centers on an unknown protagonist, controlled by the player, who awakens in a haunted suburban house and experiences supernatural occurrences. Available areas to explore in the home consist of an L-shaped corridor with two rooms adjacent to it: a bathroom, and a staircase which leads to the room in which the player starts a loop, or a continuous reincarnation of the corridor. The only actions the player can use are walking and zooming. To progress, the player must investigate frightening events and solve cryptic puzzles. Each time a loop is successfully completed, changes appear in the corridor. Additionally, the player encounters a hostile ghost named Lisa. If she catches the protagonist, the player has a random chance of triggering a jump scare when turning the camera horizontally and is sent back to the beginning of the current loop.

After the player solves the final puzzle, a cryptic and unrevealed puzzle that allows the player to escape, a trailer reveals that P.T. is a "playable teaser" for a new game in the Silent Hill series, called Silent Hills, directed by Hideo Kojima and Guillermo del Toro, with the protagonist portrayed by Norman Reedus.

Plot
P.T. centers on an unnamed protagonist who awakens in a concrete-lined room and opens a door to a haunted corridor, in which he can only walk through a hallway which continuously loops and redecorates itself. The first time he passes, a radio reports on a familicide, which was committed by the father, and later mentions two other cases exactly like it.

Later on, the protagonist encounters a hostile and unstable female apparition, presumably named Lisa. Upon entering the bathroom and being locked inside, he obtains a flashlight and finds a creature resembling an underdeveloped fetus crying in the sink. He gets out but finds out that the apparition is watching him. While it is possible to avoid the ghost completely, if the protagonist is attacked by the ghost he reawakens in the first room of the game, beginning the loop again. In this room there is a moving bloody paper bag that speaks to him, telling him of a disturbing experience and stating the same quote seen at the start of the game: "Watch out. The gap in the door... it's a separate reality. The only me is me. Are you sure the only you is you?"

The next few loops feature a refrigerator hanging from the ceiling, leaking blood. The muffled sound of a hysterically crying baby can be heard from the refrigerator, which shakes violently. After the player completes a puzzle and enters the next loop, the refrigerator is absent and the radio issues a Swedish message referencing the 1938 radio drama The War of the Worlds. In the next loop, the lamps turn completely red, the player's vision blurs, the protagonist moves abnormally quickly, and the corridor stretches out into infinity. The protagonist discovers a hole in the wall and looks through it to hear a woman being stabbed to death in the bathroom, while a voice on the radio rants about societal instability. After the sounds of the radio and the killing stop, the bathroom door opens by itself and the player enters upon the fetus-like creature telling the protagonist that ten months earlier, an unspecified person lost his job and turned to alcoholism. His wife worked as a part-time cashier to financially support the family, but the manager was sexually attracted to her. The corridor then corrects itself and the protagonist eventually hears a voice uttering "204863" repeatedly. The player's perspective distorts, and the game displays a false crash message.

When the game is restarted, the protagonist awakens in the concrete-lined room and continues the next and final loop with only the flashlight as a light source. He discovers the torn pieces of a photograph scattered throughout the hall and reassembles it in its frame. After the picture is completed and a set of tasks is done, a telephone rings; the protagonist answers the phone to hear the words "You've been chosen." The protagonist hears a door unlock and leaves the building.

In the subsequent cutscene, a voice remarks about having lived a life of regularity until his father killed him and his family without any creativity; he states his intention to return with his "new toys". The protagonist steps out into the streets of a deserted town and is revealed to be portrayed by Norman Reedus. The credits reveal the nature of the playable teaser.

Development

Kojima Productions used their game engine, the Fox Engine, to develop P.T. Hideo Kojima's intention when creating P.T. was to scare people in a unique way, as well as to deliver an interactive teaser experience instead of releasing trailers and screenshots of Silent Hills.

P.T. was designed to take players at least a week to complete, and Kojima intended the puzzles to be very enigmatic and difficult. Despite this, a few gamers reportedly finished the game within hours after the release, surprising him. Kojima intended for P.T. to be a mystery in order to make it a more frightening experience. There is little, cryptic, information given in the game on events that take place, and there are few clues as to how to solve the puzzles. He chose the corridor as the setting as opposed to "a ruin" because he wanted the teaser to emotionally affect the player regardless of "cultural background". Kojima elaborated that P.T. and Silent Hills have no canonical and direct relation, and that Silent Hills would have been enhanced by elements that were never in P.T. He based his concept of P.T. on horror films and other media that he found frightening. When creating the game, Kojima refrained from using graphic violence to build up suspense, as he felt that too many horror games rely on the trope. He wanted to elicit a more "genuine, thoughtful and permeating" type of fear.

A user was able to hack the in-game camera of P.T. to show that as soon as the player obtained the flashlight, the model of Lisa is tethered directly behind the protagonist away from the direction they are looking. This enabled the game to show fleeting shadows of Lisa and some of the sound effects associated with her that the player experiences throughout the game. The user discovered an unused scene showing Lisa's headless corpse lying in the bloody bathtub, that the player-character is modeled after Reedus throughout all parts of the game and not just at the ending, and that much of the world outside of the interior rooms is an incomplete but detailed map of Silent Hill.

Release
P.T. was originally announced at Gamescom 2014 as a demo for an eponymous mystery horror video game. It was released on 12 August 2014, on the PlayStation Network. Instead of formally announcing a new Silent Hill game, director Hideo Kojima decided to release P.T. as a game demo from a nonexistent gaming studio called 7780s Studio. In September 2014, Sony announced during its pre-Tokyo Game Show press conference that P.T. had been downloaded over a million times.

Critical reception

The game received critical acclaim. Erik Kain of Forbes enjoyed the game for its anxiety-inducing horror, and wrote that it succeeded as marketing for the upcoming Silent Hills. David Houghton of GamesRadar+ praised it for its immersive, well-executed horror and for how the game's difficulty created online discourse: "By spreading out into the real world, by forcing solutions by way of hearsay, internet whispers, and desperate, rumoured logic, it has become its own urban myth." Eurogamers Jeffrey Matulef wrote that, through its emphasis on "sound effects, visual design, choreography, and difficult to decipher enemy placements" over traditional progress, the game became immersive and terrifying. However, the puzzles in P.T. received criticism. Patrick Klepek panned the puzzles, describing them as an "exercise in frustration". Matthew Reynolds of Digital Spy wrote that the final puzzle was a "source of frustration" which lacked a clear solution. In contrast, Matulaf stated that, while the puzzles ranged in cleverness and difficulty, they added to the horror of the game by being emotionally "uncomfortable".

P.T. was also placed on some "best-of" lists in 2014. GameSpot awarded it the "Game of the Month" for August 2014. IGN's Marty Sliva chose P.T. as an honorable mention on his list of the best video game trailers of the year, describing it as "one of the most interesting, gorgeous, and terrifying" games he played that year. Another reviewer for IGN, Lucy O'Brien, described the game as "the most genuinely frightening interactive experience in recent years", making it her choice for game of the year. Giant Bomb gave the Best Horror Game of the year award to P.T., saying that "P.T. reminded us what happens when unlimited resources are thrown at a horror experience." P.T. won "Scariest Game" at Bloody Disgustings FEAR Awards. The game also won Innovation in Game Technology at the 2014 National Academy of Video Game Trade Reviewers (NAVGTR) awards. Polygon ranked it as the tenth best game of the year, and Slant Magazines staff ranked it as the eighth best video game of the year. Patrick Klepek of Kotaku originally listed the game as number one on a list of the ten best horror games on 13 February 2015, describing it as "the new king of horror." The game was replaced by Amnesia: The Dark Descent as number one when Silent Hills was cancelled and P.T. removed. In 2018, The A.V. Club ranked P.T. as the greatest horror game of all time in a list of 35. In 2017, GamesRadar+ ranked P.T. the fourth best horror game of all time out of 20.

Themes and analysis

Reviewers have identified several themes in P.T. According to Eurogamers Jeffrey Matulef, the game's main theme is "cyclical mental anguish", supported by the obscure and confusing nature of the puzzles. Danielle Riendeau of Polygon wrote that P.T. uses two primary themes from the Silent Hill series; "a sense of family trauma and domestic violence and the duality of the 'real world' and the nightmare world." She suggested that P.T. and Eraserhead shared thematic content, writing that both included a crying, deformed infant and that the film's protagonist journeyed from reality into a terrifying world.

P.T.s ceaselessly looping hallway has been a source of critical discussion. Rob Crossley of GameSpot wrote that it induced "mild claustrophobia" and "a familiarity with your surroundings." He remarked that while the length of the first part of the corridor worked to create tension, the design of the second part intentionally prevented the player from being able to keep everything in view, causing the player to feel vulnerable. David Houghton of GamesRadar+ described the looping corridor as "the conduit for everything that it builds," along with saying that "it fills that structure with an unbroken feedback loop of 'horror' ... every time you leave is a monumental relief, and every simultaneous instance of returning is a moment of primal foreboding at how things might, and almost certainly will, escalate, compounded by the knowledge of the seemingly countless iterations before." Houghton felt that the game understood how to evoke horror by working "within the realm of psychology." Polygon quoted a game player who said that "P.T.s greatest asset is its looping hallway," elaborating that it not only invokes fear, but also "curiosity, or a desire to know what will happen next." Matulef said that the claustrophobic and repetitive environment displayed in the game can hypnotize the player into a sense of vulnerability.

The majority of what is said and depicted in the game is open to interpretation, leading fans to develop and discuss theories about the nature of the events that occur in the game. Let's Players Voidburger and Bob from the video game related podcast The Grate Debate opined that the open-ended nature of P.T. is one of its greatest aspects. They said that there may be something in the game that has not been discovered yet. They noted the changing colors of the flashlight's beam in the final loop as something they still had not figured out, and they felt that the game hinted that the radio may be the main culprit behind the father's murderous actions. The podcast's YouTube channel released a video in August 2019, claiming that the whole game was a metaphor for Kojima's discontent with Konami and how he was allegedly treated by them, drawing allusions to key moments leading up to his leaving of the company in October 2015.

The game contains a Swedish line in the radio describing a radio drama from 1938 being true, which gamers suggested may be a nod to Orson Welles's radio adaptation of The War of the Worlds. This possible reference to alien invasions was noted as a continuation of a Silent Hill tradition of having secret endings that included aliens. Another theory commonly discussed is deciphering the identity of the player character. The fetus talking to the player character about his remembering moments "ten months back" seems to imply that he is the father who killed Lisa and the kids, although there is speculation that the player character may be the protagonist that was to be in Silent Hills, as shown in the trailer following the ending of P.T.

Media description

Journalists have expressed confusion about whether the game should be described as a teaser, video game, or demo. Despite ongoing debate, the game won awards for best trailer while also winning game of the month and best horror game of the year awards. While naming P.T. as an honorable mention for best trailer, Marty Sliva from IGN felt that P.T. was more of an "interactive experimental film/puzzle game". "Demo" has been one of the more common descriptions, though GameSpot was reluctant to categorize it as such. Despite it being commonly called a demo of Silent Hills, there is no evidence that it was going to be a part of Silent Hills aside from the reveal of the trailer and title after the end of the game. Hideo Kojima himself explained that it was not a demo of Silent Hills and described it as a "teaser" in a tweet.

Christopher Grant from Polygon likened P.T. to Pixar's animated shorts shown before its full-length animated feature films.

Legacy 

P.T. has been alluded to in other video games. Metal Gear Solid V: The Phantom Pain, another game directed by Kojima, includes several direct references to P.T., such as radio dialogue and sound used in the teaser. Additionally, the unreleased first-person survival horror video game Allison Road was heavily inspired by P.T.; Allison Road was to take place in a haunted townhouse in the United Kingdom and feature a male protagonist who attempts to unravel the mystery behind his missing family over five nights. In the demo, some wall graffiti directly alludes to P.T. by repeating a statement made in the game. The Park, a spin-off game from The Secret World, has a sequence inspired by P.T., and the horror games Layers of Fear and Visage were heavily inspired by P.T. as well. Kojima's Death Stranding: Director's Cut includes an Easter egg referencing P.T.

Den of Geek named the first time the player encounters Lisa as one of the most haunting images in horror genre.

In February 2016, the YouTube channel known collectively as "Oddest of the Odd" released a short film titled "Silent Hills P.T. in real life". The film draws heavily from its source material, as an unseen protagonist explores a two-story hallway loop in the first-person camera perspective. The short film was featured by IGN describing it as "incredible" while GameRant's Alexander Pan described the video as being "complete with the demo's much-touted disturbing content and eerie atmosphere."

Resident Evil 7: Biohazard has been compared with P.T. during its announcement at E3 2016 thanks in part to the Beginning Hour Demo, its first-person perspective, and its photo-realistic graphics. Jordan Amaro, the level designer of Silent Hills, was responsible for the creation of Resident Evil 7s design and setting, although he has denied that his work on Resident Evil 7 was influenced by P.T., claiming that he "wasn't part of the core team of P.T." and that "Silent Hills would have been quite different from Resident Evil 7 anyway".

Resident Evil: Village has also been compared with P.T. due to the House Beneviento level's setting and puzzle-solving mechanics.

Removal and remakes
Following news of the cancellation of Silent Hills, it was announced that P.T. would be removed from the PlayStation Network on 29 April 2015. Originally, it was reported that the demo could be re-downloaded, but in May 2015 it was no longer re-downloadable from the PlayStation Store. Cancellation of the game led to criticism of Konami. Patrick Klepek from Kotaku stated "It's fine that Konami doesn't want to make Silent Hills" but that the deletion of P.T. was wrong since the demo had become part of gaming culture. Nick Robinson of Polygon described Konami's removal as the "most irresponsible, cowardly decision possible," but that the subsequent unavailability had also made the demo "one of the coolest, most fascinating games in the history of our medium." After the cancellation, PlayStation 4 consoles with P.T. installed were listed on eBay for over $1000; eBay later pulled the auctions down. The incident has been compared to the mass selling of iPhones containing Flappy Bird after that game's removal from the iOS App Store. Guillermo del Toro, the intended future director of Silent Hills, commented on P.T.s popularity, speculating that there were people who still have a passion for the Silent Hill series.

On October 24, 2014, an Xbox user named Spawn N8NE remade the game both in and using Project Spark, titled as R.T., where users can download and play the game for free while using Project Spark. However, on August 12, 2016, the game was no longer available for download after Microsoft announced that Project Sparks online services would be shut down, and the game itself would no longer be available digitally.

On July 4, 2018, Qimsar, a 17-year-old developer and fan of P.T., remade the playable teaser for the PC and released it for free. On July 13, 2018, Konami shut down the project due to legal issues. However, Konami offered Qimsar an internship to work with its development offices.

On January 4, 2019, another remake of P.T. for the PC with VR and controller support was released for free by developer and fan Radius Gordello. In development for nine months, the remake uses the Unreal Engine 4 and keeps most of the original's assets, with the most notable change being an alteration to the game's ending in order to make it easier to reach. The developer pulled the game from its download page the same month. Initially, P.T was transferable from PlayStation 4 to PlayStation 5, though Konami has blocked people from doing so in future system updates. On May 30, 2020, modder Ambient uploaded a mod to Steam Workshop that aims to recreate the game in Half-Life: Alyx.

Notes and references

Notes

References

External links
 

2014 video games
Delisted digital-only games
Fiction about familicide
Video games about ghosts
Konami games
Mass murder in fiction
PlayStation 4 games
PlayStation 4-only games
2010s horror video games
Psychological horror games
Silent Hill games
Single-player video games
Video game controversies
Video game marketing
Video games about suicide
Video games directed by Hideo Kojima
Video games developed in Japan